The 1949 Boston Braves season was the 79th season of the franchise.

Offseason 
 December 15, 1948: Mike McCormick and Nanny Fernandez were traded by the Braves to the Brooklyn Dodgers for Pete Reiser.

Regular season

Season standings

Record vs. opponents

Roster

Player stats

Batting

Starters by position 
Note: Pos = Position; G = Games played; AB = At bats; H = Hits; Avg. = Batting average; HR = Home runs; RBI = Runs batted in

Other batters 
Note: G = Games played; AB = At bats; H = Hits; Avg. = Batting average; HR = Home runs; RBI = Runs batted in

Pitching

Starting pitchers 
Note: G = Games pitched; IP = Innings pitched; W = Wins; L = Losses; ERA = Earned run average; SO = Strikeouts

Other pitchers 
Note: G = Games pitched; IP = Innings pitched; W = Wins; L = Losses; ERA = Earned run average; SO = Strikeouts

Relief pitchers 
Note: G = Games pitched; W = Wins; L = Losses; SV = Saves; ERA = Earned run average; SO = Strikeouts

Farm system 

LEAGUE CHAMPIONS: Bluefield, High Point-Thomasville

References

External links 
1949 Boston Braves season at Baseball Reference

Boston Braves seasons
Boston Braves
Boston Braves
1940s in Boston